Allu may refer to:

Places
 Allu (island), Estonia
 Allu, Ardabil, Iran
 Allu, Ahar, East Azerbaijan Province, Iran
 Alelu, Maragheh, East Azerbaijan Province, Iran

People
 Allu (surname), a Telugu surname
 Allu Tuppurainen (born 1951), Finnish film actor
 Aleksi "Allu" Jalli (born 1992), Finnish professional Counter-Strike player

Other uses
Alû, spirit in Akkadian and Sumerian mythology

See also
 Alu, Iran (disambiguation)